In 2002 Plantlife ran a "County Flowers" campaign to assign flowers to each of the counties of the United Kingdom and the Isle of Man. The results of this campaign designated a single plant species to a "county or metropolitan area" in the UK and Isle of Man. Some English counties already had flowers traditionally associated with them before 2002, and which were different from those assigned to them by Plantlife, including the white rose for Yorkshire (assigned the harebell), the poppy for Norfolk (assigned the Alexanders), and the cowslip for Essex (assigned the poppy). Some flowers were assigned to multiple counties.

England

Isle of Man

Northern Ireland

Scotland

Wales

Notes

References

Bibliography
 The list of county flowers above is taken from the county flowers pages at Plantlife's website.
 County statuses are taken from:
 Stace, C. A., R. G. Ellis, D. H. Kent and D. J. McCosh (2003) Vice-county Census Catalogue of the Vascular Plants of Great Britain Botanical Society of the British Isles (for British counties)
 Source to be determined for Northern Ireland

Lists of flowers
County flowers